Christian Kaufmann is a retired West German slalom canoeist who competed in the mid-1960s. He won a silver medal in the C-1 team event at the 1965 ICF Canoe Slalom World Championships in Spittal.

References

German male canoeists
Medalists at the ICF Canoe Slalom World Championships

Possibly living people
Year of birth missing